This is a table of synchrotrons and storage rings used as synchrotron radiation sources, and free electron lasers.

References

External links
 List from lightsources.org (includes links to individual light sources' websites)
 BioSync – a structural biologist's resource for high energy data collection facilities (includes links and instrument information for biological beamlines)
 X-ray Data Booklet

Free-electron lasers

Physics-related lists